Despina Georgiadou (gr. Δέσποινα Γεωργιάδου) is a Greek sabre fencer. She won one of the bronze medals in the women's sabre event at the 2022 World Fencing Championships held in Cairo, Egypt. She won a silver medal in World Cup 2022 in Hammamet, Tunisia and a gold medal in World Cup 2023 in Tashkent, Uzbekistan. She has also won the gold medal in the Grand Prix of Orléans, France, 2021, the bronze medal in the Grand Prix of Orléans, France, 2022, and the gold medal in the Grand Prix of Tunis, Tunisia, 2023. She has reached a highest end-of-season ranking No 3 in sabre in 2021/2022 season and a highest ranking No 2 in March 2023. The latter is the highest ranking ever reached by a Greek fencer.

In 2018, she won a bronze medal for Greece, at the 2018 Mediterranean Games.

She is a fencing athlete of the Greek club Panathinaikos and she was named Female Athlete of the Year of this multi-sport club in 2021. In 2016, she came first at the national championship. In total, she has won 1 gold, 2 silver and 1 bronze in national championships.

Medal record

World Championship

Grand Prix

World Cup

Mediterranean Games

Satellite

National Championship

References

Greek female sabre fencers
Living people
1991 births
Mediterranean Games bronze medalists for Greece
Mediterranean Games medalists in fencing
Competitors at the 2018 Mediterranean Games
Panathinaikos fencers
20th-century Greek women
21st-century Greek women
World Fencing Championships medalists